German submarine U-164 was a Type IXC U-boat of Nazi Germany's Kriegsmarine built for service during World War II. The keel for this boat was laid down on 20 June 1940 at the Deutsche Schiff- und Maschinenbau AG, Bremen yard as yard number 703. She was launched on 1 May 1941 and commissioned on 28 November 1941 under the command of Korvettenkapitän Otto Fechner.

The U-boat's service began with training as part of the 4th U-boat Flotilla. She then moved to the 10th flotilla on 1 August 1942 for operations. She sank three ships, totalling .

She was sunk by an American aircraft on 6 January 1943.

Design
German Type IXC submarines were slightly larger than the original Type IXBs. U-164 had a displacement of  when at the surface and  while submerged. She had two shafts and two  propellers.

U-164 was fitted with six  torpedo tubes (four fitted at the bow and two at the stern), 22 torpedoes, one  SK C/32 naval gun, 180 rounds, and a  SK C/30 as well as a  C/30 anti-aircraft gun. The boat had a complement of forty-eight.

Service history

First patrol
The submarine's first patrol took her from Kiel on 18 July 1942, across the North Sea and into the Atlantic Ocean through the gap between Iceland and the Faroe Islands. She sank Stad Amsterdam on 25 August in the eastern Caribbean. The first torpedoes hit, except they were duds, probably fired from too close-in; but a coup de grǎce caused the ship to sink stern-first. The boat also sank John A. Holloway northwest of Curaçao. U-164 arrived at Lorient, in occupied France, on 7 October. She would be based at this Atlantic port for the rest of her brief career.

Second patrol and loss
She sank Brageland, a neutral Swedish ship, on 1 January 1943. A three-man boarding party inspected the ship and under the prize rules, she was torpedoed.

U-164 was sunk by an American PBY Catalina flying boat of VP-83  from northwest of Ceará State shoreline, Brazil on 6 January 1943. 54 men died, there were two survivors.

Summary of raiding history

References

Bibliography

External links

German Type IX submarines
World War II submarines of Germany
World War II shipwrecks in the Atlantic Ocean
World War II shipwrecks in the South Atlantic
Ships built in Bremen (state)
U-boats sunk by US aircraft
U-boats sunk by depth charges
U-boats commissioned in 1941
U-boats sunk in 1943
1941 ships
Maritime incidents in January 1943